Azygospore is an asexually formed zygospore in fungi.

Also known as parthenogenically formed from a gamete without gametic fusion.
 
Sometimes, gametangia fail to fuse. Gametangia become surrounded by a thick wall resulting in the formation of azygospore

References
C.J. Alexopolous, Charles W. Mims, M. Blackwell  et al., Introductory Mycology, 4th ed. (John Wiley and Sons, Hoboken NJ, 2004)  

Mycology